Remember WENN is a comedy-drama television series that aired from 1996 to 1998 on the cable channel American Movie Classics. Created and written by Rupert Holmes (with music also by Holmes) and set at the fictional Pittsburgh radio station WENN in the late 1930s and early 1940s, it depicted events (both dramatic and comic) in the personal and professional lives of the station's staff in the era before and during World War II and the Golden Age of Radio. It is not related to the real radio station in Alabama known  with the WENN callsign from 1959 to 1983 and again since 2009. The series title is a play on the phrase "remember when".

The show ran for four seasons totalling 56 episodes, including an hour-long Christmas episode. The series was slated for a fifth season, but was cancelled when new management took over AMC. Holmes says that it was his favorite writing experience in his career. After decades of being unavailable to audiences, all four seasons of the series are now available for streaming on Amazon Prime and other digital streaming services.

Major characters
Elizabeth "Betty" Roberts (Amanda Naughton) – Originally an unpaid writing intern at WENN, Betty is hired as a salaried writer after resolving a crisis at the station in the first episode. Being from Elkhart, Indiana, Betty exhibits a lot of small-town naivety and at times seems overwhelmed by living in a bigger city like Pittsburgh. While she primarily remains a writer during the course of the show, she also acts, sings, announces, reads advertisements on the air, negotiates with sponsors, and runs the station on many occasions.  Throughout the series, Betty shares romantic and reciprocated feelings for both Victor Comstock and Scott Sherwood. Her relationship with Scott sours when he admits to lying about his background. Her relationship with Victor is unconventional. While Betty shows romantic interest in him, he is usually distant and business-like toward her and appears oblivious to her veiled advances. 
Victor Comstock (John Bedford Lloyd) – The station manager of WENN during the first season of the series. Victor leaves WENN to broadcast for the BBC in London, and is reported to have been killed during a bombing raid.  Victor revisits WENN at the end of season two, revealing to Betty that he survived the bombing and is working for the American government. Victor returns as the station manager in season four but is revealed to be suffering from post traumatic stress and has no memory of the time since the bombing. He sees Betty outside of the office but does not appear to be as invested in the relationship as she is.  
Scott Sherwood (Kevin O'Rourke) – Introduced at the end of the first season as Victor Comstock's chosen successor as station manager.  In the third season, it is revealed that Scott bluffed his way into his position and is fired.  Betty re-hires Scott as an actor for the station. Though Scott was very incompetent as a station manager, he does very well as an on-air performer, even getting nominated for a Golden Lobe award. In addition, Scott shows a knack for cracking secrets codes which are suspected of being sent out over the airwaves by WENN sponsors. He makes several romantic advances toward Betty but usually gets rejected. He realizes that Betty is smitten with Victor and often eavesdrops or snoops around to try and gain an advantage in his pursuit of her. 
Jeff Singer (Hugh O'Gorman) – An actor at the station who plays the romantic lead on most of the station's programs.  Jeff travels to London to participate in Victor's broadcasts, but returns to WENN after the air raid, having sustained minor injuries.  He has a complicated romantic relationship with Hilary Booth throughout the series. They originally married several years before the first season but divorced a short time later in Mexico without telling anyone. They decided to remarry in season two secretly since everyone believed they were still married. In the third season, Jeff goes to London and marries Pavla Nemkova, re-divorcing Hilary in the process. Jeff later reveals that he only married Pavla so that he can use her to relay confidential information back to the US from war-torn London. However, it turns out that Pavla just used him to move to the US and break into the entertainment industry. Even after Hilary learns the truth, she still shuns him until his divorce is finalized. His divorce from Pavla gets finalized on the last episode.  
Hilary Booth (Melinda Mullins) – An actress at WENN who plays the female lead on most of the station's programs.  A former Broadway star, Hilary makes several attempts to return to the stage. Hilary often exhibits diva-like behavior at the station. She acts as if she is bigger than the radio programs themselves often incorporating her real life drama into the on-air scenes instead of reading from Betty's scripts. She is extremely possessive of her on-and-off again husband Jeffrey Singer. She often will put a stop to even the slightest of his interactions with other women. 
Mackie Bloom (Christopher Murney) – The "Man of a Thousand Voices" who plays many of the character roles on WENN's programs. In the third season, it was learned that Mackie served time for unknowingly driving a getaway car in a robbery. In the fourth season, he tours with an off-Broadway production and is absent from many of the episodes.
Maple LaMarsh (Carolee Carmello) – An actress and fill-in organist for WENN.  A former burlesque dancer, Maple is initially hired by friend Scott Sherwood in the second season of the series.
Tom Eldridge (George Hall) – A retired Broadway doorman who does general chores for WENN and fills in occasionally as an actor for the station. Mr. Eldridge is very absent-minded and often misinterprets puns and other forms of wordplay. In the fourth season, he buys a winning lottery ticket. He pretends to lose the ticket but it is later revealed that he used the proceeds of the ticket to keep the radio station afloat. 
Gertrude "Gertie" Reese (Margaret Hall) – The station's switchboard operator.  Gertie writes two scripts that serve as "fantasy" plots for two separate episodes of the series.
Eugenia Bremer (Mary Stout) – The station's organist who also briefly serves as the host of a short-lived nighttime program.  Eugenia begins to develop a romantic relationship with Mr. Foley late in the series.
Mr. Foley (Tom Beckett) – WENN's foley artist.  Mr. Foley has no on-screen dialogue throughout the series, though his off-screen speech is often noted by other characters to a generally comedic effect. In the second season, Mr. Foley is revealed to have a brother, who is very loud and crude.
C.J. McHugh (C.J. Byrnes) – WENN's sound engineer for the first three seasons of the series.
Celia Mellon (Dina Spybey) – An ambitious young actress who works at WENN during the series' first season.  Celia leaves the station to pursue a career as a film actress in Hollywood.

Episodes

Season 1 (1996)

Season 2 (1996–97)

Season 3 (1997)

Season 4 (1998)

Notable guest stars

Jason Alexander
Eddie Bracken
Betty Buckley
David Canary
Daniel Davis
Bob Dorian
Peter Gerety
Greg Germann
Malcolm Gets
Julie Hagerty
Harry Hamlin
Simon Jones
Patti LuPone
Peter Noone
Rue McClanahan
Roddy McDowall
Russell Means
Donna Murphy
John Ratzenberger
Dan Resin
Molly Ringwald
Howard Rollins
Mickey Rooney
J.K. Simmons
Irene Worth

Notes

External links

Rupert Holmes website for Remember WENN
Remember WENN website created by Rodney Walker
Linda Young’s Remember WENN website

1990s American comedy-drama television series
1996 American television series debuts
1998 American television series endings
AMC (TV channel) original programming
Television series set in the 1930s
Television series set in the 1940s
Television shows set in Pittsburgh
English-language television shows
Works by Rupert Holmes
Television series about radio